William "Pete" H. Mandley (born July 29, 1961 in Mesa, Arizona), is a former professional American football player who was selected by the Detroit Lions in the 2nd round of the 1984 NFL Draft. A 5'10" 191 lbs. wide receiver from Northern Arizona, Mandley played in 7 NFL seasons from 1984–1990. His best year as a pro came during the 1987 season for the Lions when he caught 58 receptions for 720 yards and 7 touchdowns.

On August 16, 1987, Mandley and his family were supposed to be on Northwest Airlines Flight 255 from Detroit to Phoenix when his daughter had taken ill.  He cancelled his reservation and decided that he and his family would stay in Detroit an extra day.  He later learned that the flight had crashed on takeoff killing all but one on board.

References

External links
 Database Football

1961 births
Living people
Sportspeople from Mesa, Arizona
American football wide receivers
American football return specialists
Northern Arizona Lumberjacks football players
Detroit Lions players
Kansas City Chiefs players